A hull loss is an aviation accident that catastrophically damages the aircraft beyond economical repair, resulting in a total loss. The term also applies to situations in which the aircraft is missing, the search for their wreckage is terminated or when the wreckage is logistically inaccessible.

The metric of "Hull losses per 100,000 flight departures" has been used throughout the aviation industry to measure the relative risk of a given flight or aircraft. From 1959 to 2006, the first part of the mainstream jet aircraft era, 384 of 835 hull losses, or 46%, were nonfatal. Airlines typically have insurance to cover hull loss on a twelve-month basis. Before the September 11 attacks in 2001, the typical insured sum for a hull loss policy could reach $250 million. 

Constructive hull loss takes into account other incidental expenses beyond repair, such as salvage, logistical costs of repairing non-airworthy aircraft within the confines of the incident site, and recertifying the aircraft, among other factors. Insurance policies covering any asset that is subject to depreciation typically pay the insured a formulaic used item value, so the property will often be a write-off as full repairs minus this sum resemble a cost of a new replacement.

See also
List of accidents and incidents involving commercial aircraft
Total loss
Constructive total loss

References

Aviation accidents and incidents